The Faraggiana Ferrandi Natural History Museum is a biological and zoological collection, most of which was collected in the 19th century, and is located in via Gaudenzio Ferrari, of the city of Novara, Piedmont, Italy.

Collection
The exhibits contain some 450 species, mostly taxidermy specimens, along with skulls, hides, and other artifacts. The material was mainly assembled by Catherine Faraggiana Ferrandi, her brother the explorer Ugo Ferrandi, and her son Alessandro. Catherine and her son maintained exhibits and a zoologic park at the Villa Farragiana a Meina. Since 1959, the collections were moved to the Faraggiana Ferrandi palace inside the city, and became property of the comune. Further acquisitions have added species from the region of the Piedmont, to create a natural museum including specimens from the local environment.

Some of the specimens include rare and nearly extinct species, including siamang gibbons, red panda, Amur leopard, snow leopard, and the Berber lion Panthera leo leo, now extinct in the wild.

The museum has twelve rooms, each dedicated to a specific topic: 
Classification and Evolution (from Linnaeus to Darwin)
Geographic Distribution of Animals 
Fauna of the Mediterranean maquis
Fauna of Africa
Fauna of the Poles
Fauna of Asia
Fauna of Himalayas & Tibet
Fauna of Tundra & Taiga
Fauna of Woodlands of Piedmont (Deciduous and conifer)
Fauna of Wetlands of Piedmont 
Human Environments

References

Further reading
 Giovanni Pinna. Alessandro Faraggiana, Ugo Ferrandi and the Birth of the Museum of Novara. 2004

Buildings and structures in Novara
Museums in Piedmont
Faraggiana Ferrandi
Natural history museums in Italy
Museums established in 1959